The 1967 Kansas Jayhawks football team represented the University of Kansas in the Big Eight Conference during the 1967 NCAA University Division football season. In their first season under head coach Pepper Rodgers, the Jayhawks compiled a 5–5 record (5–2 against conference opponents), tied for second place in the Big Eight Conference, and outscored their opponents by a combined total of 166 to 146. They played their home games at Memorial Stadium in Lawrence, Kansas.

The team's statistical leaders included Bobby Douglass with 1,326 passing yards and 415 rushing yards and John Mosier with 495 receiving yards. Mike Sweatman was the team captain.

Schedule

References

Kansas
Kansas Jayhawks football seasons
Kansas Jayhawks football